Asagiri Station may refer to:

 Asagiri Station (Hyōgo) on the Sanyo Main Line
 Asagiri Station (Kumamoto) on the Kumagawa Railroad Yunomae Line